The England Public School District is a school district headquartered in England, Arkansas, United States. It serves territory in Lonoke County, including England, Coy, and Keo.

The district has two schools, England Elementary School (Grades K-8) and England High School (Grades 7–12).

In 1968 the England School District started a night program at the Tucker Unit, an Arkansas Department of Correction prison in Tucker.

References

External links

Education in Lonoke County, Arkansas
Education in Jefferson County, Arkansas
School districts in Arkansas